Parow Park is a sports venue in Cape Town, South Africa.

The venue has hosted football matches for several teams Premier Soccer League and National First Division teams, including Cape Town All Stars, Santos F.C., Stellenbosch F.C., Ubuntu Cape Town.

References 

Soccer venues in South Africa
Sports venues in Cape Town